Gareth Hughes was an actor.

Gareth Hughes may also refer to:

Gareth Hughes (politician)
Gareth Hughes (equestrian)

See also
Gary Hughes (disambiguation)